Luo Zuqing (born 27 April 1993 in Meizhou) is a Chinese professional football player who currently plays for China League Two side Shenzhen Pengcheng.

Club career
In 2011, Luo Zuqing started his professional footballer career with Guangdong Sunray Cave in the China League One. On 25 May 2011, he made his senior debut in the third round of 2011 Chinese FA Cup against Yanbian Baekdu Tigers, coming on as a substitute in the 89th minute as a midfielder. He made his goalkeeper debut on 1 June 2012, in the second round of 2012 Chinese FA Cup against Hebei Zhongji.

On 5 January 2014, Luo transferred to Chinese Super League side Henan Jianye. On 13 May 2015, he made his debut for Henan in the third round of the 2015 Chinese FA Cup against Anhui Litian. Luo made his Super League debut in a 2015 Chinese Super League match against Changchun Yatai, coming on as a substitute for Lü Jianjun in the 70th minute. He played as a striker for the club in the match.

In January 2017, Luo transferred to Meizhou Kejia. In March 2018, he was loaned to Shenzhen Pengcheng until 31 December 2018.

Club career statistics 
Statistics accurate as of match played 12 October 2019

References

1993 births
Living people
Footballers from Meizhou
Hakka sportspeople
Guangdong Sunray Cave players
Henan Songshan Longmen F.C. players
Meizhou Hakka F.C. players
China League One players
Chinese Super League players
Association football goalkeepers
Chinese footballers